This was the first edition of this tournament.

2nd seed Paul Capdeville won the final, defeating Pierre-Ludovic Duclos 7–5, 6–1.

Seeds

Draw

Finals

Top half

Bottom half

References
 Main Draw
 Qualifying Draw

Jalisco Open - Singles
2011 Singles